Gabriel Mattos (born 13 November 1957) is a Brazilian former professional tennis player.

Mattos is originally from São Paulo and went to college in the United States. In 1978 he won the USTA national amateur clay court championships, as well as the Mid-Atlantic regional title. His professional performances included an ATP Challenger doubles title back in his native São Paulo in 1983. He had a best singles world ranking of 347.

ATP Challenger titles

Doubles: (1)

References

External links
 
 

1957 births
Living people
Brazilian male tennis players
Tennis players from São Paulo